Kim Song-sun (born December 31, 1995) is a North Korean football player. He plays for Japan Football League club Veertien Mie.

References

External links

1995 births
Living people
Association football people from Aichi Prefecture
North Korean footballers
North Korea youth international footballers
J3 League players
FC Ryukyu players
Nara Club players
Association football midfielders